Miheșu de Câmpie is a commune in Mureș County, Transylvania, Romania. It is composed of eight villages: Bujor (Kendeffytanya), Cirhagău (Cserhágó), Groapa Rădăii (Laposdülőtanya), Miheșu de Câmpie, Mogoaia, Răzoare (Mezővelkér), Șăulița (Kissályi) and Ștefanca.

See also
List of Hungarian exonyms (Mureș County)

References

Communes in Mureș County
Localities in Transylvania